Nutborne Marshes is a   Local Nature Reserve east of Thorney Island in West Sussex. It is owned and managed by  Chichester Harbour Conservancy. It is part of the Chichester Harbour Site of Special Scientific Interest and Nature Conservation Review site, Grade I*,  the Chichester and Langstone Harbours Ramsar site and Special Protection Area,  and the Solent Maritime Special Area of Conservation.

This is an area of intertidal and subtidal saltmarsh and mudflats. There are many invertebrates on the mudflats such as ragworms and the banks have unusual plants including sea wormwood. Migrating birds include curlews, grey plovers and dunlins.

There is no access to the site but it can be viewed from a footpath.

References

Local Nature Reserves in West Sussex